is a member of the Japanese Communist Party serving in the House of Representatives as a representative of the Chūgoku region's proportional block. He is against a reinterpretation of Article 9 of the Japanese Constitution to allow for collective self defence. Ohira is also against nuclear weapons and thinks that the world should cooperate in the goal of eliminating them.

References

1978 births
Living people
Japanese communists
Japanese Communist Party politicians
Members of the House of Representatives (Japan)